The Sikh Federation (UK) describes itself as a non-governmental organisation that works with the main political parties to promote relevant Sikh issues. The organisation is a major pro-Khalistan organisation and supports Khalistani secessionist activities.

It is a pressure group often referred to as the first Sikh political party in the United Kingdom. SFUK says that it is based on the 'miri-piri' principle: the Sikh principle that temporal and spiritual goals are indivisible.

The group have also criticised a claim by Boris Johnson that “UK Khalistanis” may be “threatening” India. During his much vaunted trip to India in April 2022, UK Conservative government Prime Minister Boris Johnson claimed the two nations had agreed to set up an “anti-extremist taskforce” to tackle “Khalistani extremists” that were “threatening India”.

The British Sikh Association defied the Sikh Federation UK for its demand for an independent state for the Sikhs after British Prime Minister Boris Johnson assured that his government does not support the Khalistan movement. It further alleges Sikh Federation UK, which is allegedly working on the behest of Pakistan's secret agency ISI.

The organisation was established in September 2003 with the aim of giving Sikhs a stronger political voice by taking an increasing interest in mainstream politics in the UK. The leadership  of Sikh Federation is almost entirely made from former members of International Sikh Youth Federation (ISYF).  In 2018, India asked UK to ban SFUK for its anti-India, pro-Khalistan activities, including proscribing the organisation. The group is a successor to the International Sikh Youth Federation, which remains banned as a terrorist organisation in several countries.

The International Sikh Youth Federation (ISYF) is a proscribed organisation that aims to establish an independent homeland for the Sikhs of India in Khalistan.[1] It is banned as a terrorist organisation under Australian, European Union,[2] Japanese,[3] Indian,[4] Canadian[5] and American[6] counter-terrorism legislation.[7] The Government of India has declared it a terrorist organisation.[8]

Leadership
 Amrik Singh Gill was the Chairman of the Sikh Federation (UK).

The Sikh Federation UK has a 15-member executive panel that manages and drives the SFUK agenda and activities, supported by a national and regional structure with local membership. The Federation's most prominent spokesman is Dabinderjit Singh.

APPG
The All Party Parliamentary Group (APPG) for British Sikhs is currently chaired by Britain’s Sikh MP Preet Kaur Gill. Sikh Federation (UK) is the APPG’s secretariat.

References

External links 
 Sikh Federation (UK)
 SFUK Facebook 
 SFUK Twitter 

Sikh politics
2003 establishments in the United Kingdom
Political parties established in 2003
Sikh organisations based in the United Kingdom